Grumpy Gumphrey Supersleuth, often known simply as Super Sleuth, is a computer game for the ZX Spectrum by Gremlin Graphics, a software developer based in Sheffield, United Kingdom. It is an action-adventure game: the player controls Grumpy, a store detective and general dogsbody working in a large department store. The game was developed by Shaun Hollingworth with loading-screen graphics by Marco Duroe.

Gameplay

The player takes the role of an ageing store detective, 'Grumpy' Gumphrey, and the aim is for Gumphrey to keep his job. In order to do so, he must fulfil various tasks assigned to him by various shoppers, and by the boss of the store, known only as 'Sir'. Although Gumphrey is described as a 'store detective', he has to complete a number of tasks more associated with a cleaner or engineer, such as spraying bugs in the cafe, repairing the lift, and tidying the storeroom. Some of the tasks verge on the surreal, such as shooting ducks that have entered the store, and caging a gorilla on the loose.

The game is set in a large, traditional department store named 'Mole Bros'; the name is a nod to Wanted: Monty Mole, a 1984 Gremlin Graphics game that had proved a hit. The player character in Grumpy Gumphrey Supersleuth can visit 39 screens, designed to look like the different areas in a department store, with different kinds of merchandise, as well as a cafe, a kitchen, a store room, a boiler room, and the manager's office. 

The tasks generally involve puzzles that require Grumpy to acquire certain items and use them in a particular way in certain screens. They may also require dexterous manipulation of the player character. For example, the first task requires Grumpy to steal the handgun from under his boss's chair – a feat that requires careful keyboard or joystick work – in order to shoot the ducks.  

Grumpy is hampered by other shoppers (non player characters) in the store, and must work against the clock to complete the tasks on time. Failure to do so will result in a warning letter from the boss; four warning letters lead to game over.

Reception

Grumpy Gumphrey Supersleuth was well-received when published. Sinclair User gave the game 5/5 stars, while
Crash awarded an 86% rating. Both magazines highlighted the originality of the game, with Sinclair User praising the 'novel plot', and Crash calling Grumpy the 'first geriatric hero to star in a computer game'. Both magazines also praised the game's graphics, animation, and its polish.

References

External links
 Review of Grumpy Gumphrey Supersleuth by Crispin Driver at Retro Gamer, 6 December 2008. 
 Video walkthrough of Grumpy Gumphrey Supersleuth on YouTube by RZX Archive, 15 December 2012.
Grumpy Gumphrey Supersleuth at World of Spectrum

1985 video games
Action-adventure games
Detective video games
Video games about birds
Video games about primates
Video games developed in the United Kingdom
ZX Spectrum games
ZX Spectrum-only games